On Every Street is the sixth and final studio album by British rock band Dire Straits, released on 9 September 1991 by Vertigo Records internationally, and by Warner Bros. Records in the United States. The follow-up to the band's massively successful album Brothers in Arms, On Every Street reached the top of the UK Albums Chart and was also certified platinum by the RIAA.

History
On Every Street was released more than six years after the band's previous album, Brothers in Arms, and was Dire Straits' final studio album. It reached number 12 in the United States and number one in the United Kingdom and numerous European countries. The album was produced by Mark Knopfler and Dire Straits.

By this time, the band comprised Knopfler, John Illsley, Alan Clark and Guy Fletcher, and the album features session musicians including Paul Franklin, Phil Palmer, Danny Cummings and American drummer Jeff Porcaro from Toto, who was asked to play the band's subsequent world tour, although he declined because of other commitments, both with Toto and as a studio musician.

Dire Straits promoted the album with a world tour which lasted until the end of 1992. The group disbanded in 1995, after which Mark Knopfler pursued a solo career.

The album was remastered and reissued with the rest of the Dire Straits catalogue in 1996 for most of the world, except for the United States, where it was reissued on 19 September 2000.

Track listing
The album was released on LP, compact cassette, Digital Compact Cassette and CD. The track list below corresponds to the original LP and cassette variants.

The LP version has the same duration as the CD and cassette versions, being more than one hour long. This was achieved by narrowing the grooves on vinyl, which reduced the sound level. The 2014 pressing of the album spans two LPs with three songs per side.

All songs written by Mark Knopfler.

^Certain versions of the album feature a slightly longer version of "Heavy Fuel" (length of 5:10), which includes approximately four measures of additional instrumental music both between the first chorus and second verse, and between the bridge and the third verse. It is unclear if the 5:10 version is the original "uncut" version or if these instrumental passages were simply added afterward to extend the song.

Personnel 
Dire Straits
 Mark Knopfler – vocals, lead and rhythm guitars
 John Illsley – bass, backing vocals
 Alan Clark – keyboards, string conductor (9)
 Guy Fletcher – keyboards, backing vocals

Additional musicians
 Phil Palmer – guitars
 Vince Gill – guitar and backing vocals (5)
 Paul Franklin – pedal steel guitar, acoustic lap steel guitar (6)
 Jeff Porcaro – drums, percussion
 Manu Katché – drums and percussion (7, 11)
 Danny Cummings – percussion
 Chris White – flute, saxophones 
 George Martin – string arranger and conductor (9)

Production 
 Mark Knopfler – producer 
 Dire Straits – producers
 Chuck Ainlay – engineer
 Bill Schnee – engineer
 Steve Orchard – assistant engineer
 Jack Joseph Puig – assistant engineer
 Andy Strange – assistant engineer
 Neil Dorfsman – mixing (1-6, 8-11)
 Bob Clearmountain – mixing (7)
 Avril Mackintosh – mix assistant 
 Bob Ludwig – mastering at Masterdisk (New York City, New York)
 Jo Motta – project coordinator
 Sutton Cooper – design
 Paul Cummins – design
 Paul Williams – sleeve photography
 Ron Eve – guitar technician to Mark Knopfler

Singles
On Every Street produced six singles:
 "Calling Elvis"
 "Heavy Fuel"
 "On Every Street"
 "The Bug"
 "You and Your Friend" (released in France and Germany)
 "Ticket to Heaven" (released in The Netherlands)

Charts

Weekly charts

Year-end charts

Singles charts

Sales and certifications

References

External links
 On Every Street at Mark Knopfler's website

Dire Straits albums
1991 albums
Albums produced by Mark Knopfler
Vertigo Records albums
Warner Records albums
Roots rock albums
Albums produced by Alan Clark (keyboardist)